Biscutella laevigata, the buckler-mustard, Biscutella laevigata is a species of perennial herb in the family crucifers. They have a self-supporting growth form. They are associated with freshwater habitat. They have simple, broad leaves. Individuals can grow to 0.23 m.

Cultivation 
Rapidly germinating, keep seed in constant moisture (not wet) with temperatures of about +20°C [68°F]. Seeds must be covered thinly. Do not cover very small seeds, but tightly press into the earth. Keep in cooler conditions after germination occurs.

Subspecies
Biscutella laevigata varia
Biscutella laevigata lucida
Biscutella laevigata kerneri

References

External link

laevigata
Flora of the Alps
Flora of the Carpathians
Flora of the Pyrenees